Kred may refer to:

Places
 Kred, Slovenia

Other
 KRED (FM), Eureka, California radio station
 .kred top level domain